Mihai Nicolae Tănăsescu (born January 11, 1956) is a Romanian economist and politician.

Born in Bucharest, he graduated from the finance and accounting faculty of the Bucharest Academy of Economic Studies in 1978. From that year until 1983, he headed the accounting department at a Bucharest factory. From 1983 to 1990, he was an economist at the Finance Ministry. Following the Romanian Revolution, he remained at the ministry, heading a series of departments until 1997. From 1997 to 2000, he worked at the World Bank. From 2000 to 2004, he was Finance Minister in the Adrian Năstase cabinet. In 2002, he was made both a commander of the Legion of Honour and a knight of the Order of the Star of Romania. In 2004, he was elected to the Chamber of Deputies on the lists of the Social Democratic Party; he served until May 2007, when he resigned. In the Chamber, he represented Argeș County, and was president of the budget and finance committee. Following his resignation, he became Romania's representative at the International Monetary Fund. In 2012, he was named a vice president of the European Investment Bank.

He is married and has two children.

Notes

1956 births
Politicians from Bucharest
Bucharest Academy of Economic Studies alumni
Romanian economists
World Bank people
International Monetary Fund people
Social Democratic Party (Romania) politicians
Members of the Chamber of Deputies (Romania)
Romanian Ministers of Finance
Commandeurs of the Légion d'honneur
Knights of the Order of the Star of Romania
Living people
Romanian officials of the United Nations